Pawtella is a rural locality in the local government area (LGA) of Southern Midlands in the Central LGA region of Tasmania. The 2016 census recorded a population of 39 for the state suburb of Pawtella.

History 
Pawtella was gazetted as a locality in 1972. The name is believed to be an Aboriginal word for ringtail possum.

Geography
Most of the boundaries are survey lines.

Road infrastructure 
Route C309 (Nala Road) runs through from north to south.

References

Towns in Tasmania
Localities of Southern Midlands Council